Weng Cho Chew (born 1953 in Malaysia) is a Malaysian-American electrical engineer and applied physicist known for contributions to wave physics, especially computational electromagnetics. He is a Distinguished Professor of Electrical and Computer Engineering at Purdue University.

Career 
Chew received his Bachelor's, Master's and PhD degrees in electrical engineering from the Massachusetts Institute of Technology in 1976, 1978 and 1980, respectively. Following his doctoral studies, Chew joined Schlumberger-Doll Research in 1981 where he rose to the rank of department manager. In 1985, he accepted a position at the University of Illinois Urbana-Champaign, where he was Director of the Electromagnetics Lab from 1995 to 2007.  From 2007 to 2011, Chew served as Dean of Engineering at the University of Hong Kong. In 2017, Chew joined the School of Electrical and Computer Engineering at Purdue University.

Chew's chief contributions are in the areas of waves in inhomogeneous media for various geophysical subsurface sensing and non-destructive testing applications, integrated circuits, microstrip antenna applications, fast and efficient algorithms for solving wave scattering and radiation problems, stretched coordinate perfectly matched layers, and inverse scattering using distorted Born approximation.

Chew has developed fast solvers that make it possible to simulate the electromagnetic behavior of structures of unprecedented sizes. Specifically, his group had the first working multilevel fast multipole algorithm (MLFMA) that when adopted by other groups, subsequently helped increase the size of solvable problems by six orders of magnitude. More recently, Chew has turned his attention toward combining quantum theory with electromagnetics, as well as combining computational electromagnetics with differential geometry. He has also recently derived quantum Maxwell's equations directly in coordinate space.

Chew is the author of Waves and Fields in Inhomogeneous Media (Van Nostrand Reinhold 1990; reprinted by IEEE Press, 1995), the co-author of Integral Equation Methods for Electromagnetic and Elastic Waves (Morgan & Claypool, 2008), and co-editor of Fast and Efficient Algorithms in Computational Electromagnetics (Artech House, 2001). In 2018, Chew served as President of the IEEE Antennas and Propagation Society. He is Editor-in-Chief of Progress in Electromagnetic Research and previously was Editor-in-Chief of the Journal of Electromagnetic Waves and Applications.  He has helped organize the PIERS meetings around the world.

Notable students or postdoctoral researchers of Chew include: Qing Huo Liu (Duke University), Mahta Moghaddam (University of Southern California), Fernando Teixeira (Ohio State University), Kaladhar Radhakrishnan (Intel), Lijun Jiang (Chinese University of Hong Kong), Phil Atkins (KLA Tencor), Jiming Song (Iowa State University), and Karl Warnick (Brigham Young University).

Awards and honors 
Chew was elected Member of the National Academy of Engineering in 2013, “for contributions to large-scale computational electromagnetics of complex structures.” He is a Fellow of the Institute of Electrical and Electronics Engineers (IEEE) (1993), the Optical Society of America (2003), the Institute of Physics (2004), the Electromagnetics Academy (2007) and the Hong Kong Institution of Engineers (2009).  Chew received the IEEE Electromagnetics Award in 2017, the Applied Computation Electromagnetics Society Award in Computational Electromagnetics in 2015, and the IEEE Antennas and Propagation Society Chen-To Tai Distinguished Educator Award in 2008, “[f]or outstanding contributions to education in the fields of electromagnetic theory and computational electromagnetics.” He also received the Sergei A. Schelkunoff Best Paper Award from IEEE Transactions on Antennas and Propagation (with Jun-Sheng Zhao) in 2001, the Campus Wide Excellence in Professional and Graduate Teaching Award from the University of Illinois Urbana-Champaign in 2001, and the IEEE Leon K. Kirchmayer Graduate Teaching Award in 2000, among other recognitions. Chew was named an ISI Highly Cited Researcher in 2001 and he is an Honorary Professor at Tsinghua University, China, Honorary Professor at National Taiwan University, Taipei, and a Distinguished Visiting Scholar at The University of Hong Kong.

Recent Publications 

 Xia, T., Atkins, P., Sha, W. E. I., & Chew, W. C. (open access) "Casimir Force: Vacuum Fluctuation, Zero-Point Energy, and Computational Electromagnetics," IEEE Antennas and Propagation Magazine. .
Chew, W. C., Na, D.-Y., Roth, T. E., Ryu, C. J., & Kudeki, E. (2021) "Quantum Maxwell's Equations Made Simple," IEEE Antennas and Propagation Magazine.
Volume: 63, Issue: 1, Feb.  
Na, D.-Y. & Chew, W. C. (2020) "Classical and Quantum Electromagnetic Interferences: What Is The Difference?," Progress In Electromagnetics Research, 168: 1–13.
Na, D.-Y., Zhu, J., Chew, W. C., & Teixeira, F. L. (2020) "Quantum information preserving computational electromagnetics," Physical Review A, 102(1): 013711.
Na, D.-Y. Na & Chew, W. C. (2020) "Quantum Electromagnetic Finite-Difference Time Domain Solver," Quantum Reports, 2: 253-265.
Chew, W. C., Liu, A. Y., Salazar-Lazaro, C., Na, D.-Y., & Sha, W. E. I. (2019) "Hamilton Equations, Commutator, and Energy Conservation," Quantum Reports, 1: 295–303.
Sha, W. E. I., Liu, A. Y., and Chew, W. C. (2018) "Dissipative quantum electromagnetics," IEEE Journal on Multiscale and Multiphysics Computational Techniques, 3:198–213.
Chen, S. C., & Chew, W. C. (2017) "Numerical electromagnetic frequency domain analysis with discrete exterior calculus," Journal of Computational Physics, 350:668–689.
Chew, W. C. (2016) "Quantum mechanics made simple: Lecture notes UIUC," http://wcchew.ece.illinois.edu/chew/course/QMAll20161206.pdf.
Chew, W. C., Liu, A. Y., Salazar-Lazaro, C., & Sha, W. E. I. (2016) "Quantum Electromagnetics: A New Look—Part I,"  IEEE Journal on Multiscale and Multiphysics Computational Techniques, 1:73–84.
 Chew, W. C., Liu, A. Y., Salazar-Lazaro, C., & Sha, W. E. I. (2016) "Quantum Electromagnetics: A New Look—Part II,"  IEEE Journal on Multiscale and Multiphysics Computational Techniques, 1: 85–97.
Dai, Q. I., Liu, Q. S., Gan, H. U., & Chew, W. C. (2015) "Combined field integral equation-based theory of characteristic mode," IEEE Transactions on Antennas and Propagation, 63(9): 3973–3981.
 Atkins, P. R., Chew, W. C., Li, M., Sun, L. E., Ma, Z. H., & Jiang, L. J. (2014) "Casimir force for complex objects using domain decomposition techniques," Progress In Electromagnetics Research, 149: 275–280.
 Chew, W.C. (2014) "Vector potential electromagnetics with generalized gauge for inhomogeneous media: Formulation." Progress In Electromagnetics Research, 149: 69–84.
Atkins, P. R., Dai, Q. I., Sha, W. E. I., & Chew, W. C. (2013) "Casimir Force for Arbitrary Objects Using the Argument Principle and Boundary Element Methods," Progress In Electromagnetics Research, 142: 615–624.

See also
Characteristic mode analysis

References

External links 
Purdue University Profile

1953 births
Living people
20th-century American engineers
20th-century American physicists
21st-century American engineers
21st-century American physicists
Academic staff of the University of Hong Kong
American electrical engineers
American expatriates in Hong Kong
American people of Chinese descent
American university and college faculty deans
Electrical engineering academics
Fellow Members of the IEEE
Fellows of the Institute of Physics
Fellows of Optica (society)
Malaysian emigrants to the United States
Malaysian people of Chinese descent
Members of the United States National Academy of Engineering
Microwave engineers
MIT School of Engineering alumni
Optical engineers
Purdue University faculty
University of Illinois Urbana-Champaign faculty
American textbook writers